Posthuma is a Dutch surname that may refer to
Carst Posthuma (1868–1939), Dutch cricket player
Danielle Posthuma (born 1972), Dutch neuroscientist
Folkert Posthuma (1874–1943), Dutch politician
Jan Posthuma (born 1963), Dutch volleyball player 
Joost Posthuma (born 1981), Dutch road bicycle racer 

Dutch-language surnames